Regideso (Régie de distribution d'eau) is a public sector company in the Democratic Republic of the Congo charged with the production and distribution of water to residential, commercial and industrial customers.  It is a public utility, and it was founded in 1933.  Regideso is an autonomous company within the Department of Mines and Energy of the government of the DRC.  Its head offices are located in Kinshasa.

External links
Regideso.com - official site
Regideso at DRCongo Yellow Pages

Companies based in Kinshasa
Infrastructure in the Democratic Republic of the Congo
Water in the Democratic Republic of the Congo